Leif Olsen (15 August 1927 – 2 February 2012) was a Norwegian football striker.

Born Leif Hugo Olsson, he assumed the name Leif Olsen while playing for Vålerenga. After the Second World War, when he fled to Sweden in 1943 and enrolled in the Norwegian police troops, he started his football career in Jordal AIL in 1946. He then divided his club career across Vålerenga and Strømmen and represented Norway as a B and full international.

References

1927 births
2012 deaths
Footballers from Oslo
Norwegian expatriates in Sweden
Norwegian footballers
Vålerenga Fotball players
Strømmen IF players
Norway international footballers
Association football forwards
World War II refugees